Patriarch Cyril V may refer to:

 Patriarch Cyril V Zaim (about 1655 – 1720)
 Patriarch Cyril V of Constantinople (ruled 1748–1751 and 1752–1757)
 Pope Cyril V of Alexandria, Pope of Alexandria & Patriarch of the See of St. Mark in 1874–1927